Clones Abbey is a ruined monastery that later became an Augustinian abbey in the twelfth century, and its main sights are ecclesiastical. The Abbey was formerly known as St. Tighernach Abbey, and was referred to locally as the "wee abbey". Parochial and monastic settlements were separated, and it seems likely that the building became the Abbey of St. Peter and Paul. In the Book of Armagh and Annals of Ulster the word Clones is referenced as "Clauin Auis" and "Cluain Auiss," respectively. As there is no word in standard dictionaries of Old Irish that give the form "auis" or "eois", Seosamh Ó Dufaigh has speculated that the word is a cognate of the welsh word for point or a tip: "awch". Although, Bearnard O'Dubhthaigh disputes this theory on the grounds that the earlier form of "awch" is "afwch". Folklore suggests that the monastic town was originally called "Cluin Innish" on account of it being surrounded by water.

History 
The Town of Clones and the Abbey were founded by St. Tigernach (anglicised St. Tierney) in the 6th century. St. Tigernach or Tierney's abbey was dedicated to St. Peter and St. Paul. The abbey was destroyed by fire in 836, 1095, and 1184. In 1207, Hugh de Lacy destroyed the abbey and town; but five years after they were rebuilt by the English, who also erected a castle here. The ruins of a 12th-century abbey can be found on Abbey Street, along with a sarcophagus with worn animal-head carvings reputed to have been built to house the remains of St. Tigernach, and a 9th-century truncated 22m-high round tower, which was originally about 75 ft high and had a conical cap; and a well-preserved 10th-century high cross on the Diamond, decorated with drama-charged biblical stories such as Daniel in the lion's den, Abrahams sacrifice of Isaac, Adam and the tree and the serpent. On the reverse side, new testament scenes are illustrated. The multiplication of the loaves, the miracle at Cana, the baptism of Christ.

The Protestant reformation lead to the suppression of the monasteries by Henry VIII in the 16th century, and the monastic settlement in Clones was destroyed. By the 17th century the abbey was a ruin, but solitary monks continued to live in the locality up until the 18th century. An English garrison was later established within the ruins.

Style
The church is Romanesque in style and is evidence of the Roman church in Clones. The round-headed window is interesting, the head of which was cut out of a single stone. On the northern wall, there is a small Celtic cross sculptured in relief on a stone.

Monuments

Round Tower 
The Round Tower can be seen from Cara Street. The horizontal lintels and small windows are signs of early masonry. The doorway lacks the Romanesque arch, that is typical of medieval Christian buildings. These attributes lead one to the conclusion that it is among the oldest of the round towers on the British Isles. The tower was built to have five floors, ending in the top with a large, rectangular window. The roof of the building was undoubtedly a bencobhair; a stone, conical roof as is typical of Irish round towers. The tower itself would have reached seventy-five feet; but in its current, roofless state only reaches fify-one. There is damage to the masonry on the exterior below the door, to the right. The cracked appearance of the stones suggests heat damage. This could be from any of the numerous instances in which the monastery was razed.

Abbey 
The Abbey on McCurtain's street is a stone building: a limestone interior and sandstone exterior. The front of the building is the most well preserved. The ashlar masonry and Romanesque arch can easily be appreciated. A single window remains on the building. According to William Frederick Wakeman, the single window: cut out of a single stone, with a recessed moulding and dressed masonry, bears a resemblance to the windows on Clonmacnoise's McCarthy tower. The most singular feature of the Abbey is easily missed. Located on the exterior wall opposite the window, is a single cut stone bearing the mark of a cross. The cross is haloed in a fashion distinctly recognisable as the style of the Irish "Celtic cross". Its function has led to speculation as it is not something seen on churches of the period elsewhere.

Abbot of Clones
The Abbot was the Primus Abbas or first mitred abbot of Ireland.

List of Notable Coarbs & Abbots
Note: From 1398 to 1435, we have an instance of the clash that frequently occurred between the papal provisor and the bishop's nominee.

See also
List of abbeys and priories in Ireland

Notes

References

Further reading

Christian monasteries in the Republic of Ireland
Clones, County Monaghan
Ruins in the Republic of Ireland
Christian monasteries established in the 9th century
Augustinian monasteries in the Republic of Ireland
Culdees
Ruined abbeys and monasteries